The 2018 Internazionali di Tennis Città di Perugia was a professional tennis tournament played on clay courts. It was the fourth edition of the tournament which was part of the 2018 ATP Challenger Tour. It took place in Perugia, Italy between 10 and 15 July 2018.

Singles main-draw entrants

Seeds

 1 Rankings are as of 2 July 2018.

Other entrants
The following players received wildcards into the singles main draw:
  Nicolás Almagro
  Pablo Andújar
  Jacopo Berrettini
  Enrico Dalla Valle

The following players received entry from the qualifying draw:
  Gonzalo Escobar
  Ante Pavić
  Cristian Rodríguez
  Pol Toledo Bagué

The following player received entry as a lucky loser:
  Ulises Blanch

Champions

Singles

  Ulises Blanch def.  Gianluigi Quinzi 7–5, 6–2.

Doubles

  Daniele Bracciali /  Matteo Donati def.  Tomislav Brkić /  Ante Pavić 6–3, 3–6, [10–7].

References

Internazionali di Tennis Città di Perugia
2018
July 2018 sports events in Italy
2018 in Italian tennis